Avi Ben-Abraham is an Israeli-American scientist, member of the Association of American Physicians and Surgeons.

Politics 

In 1999, Ben-Abraham was endorsed by Israel's Prime Minister Benjamin Netanyahu, and won the primaries for a top seat on the governing Likud party list of candidates for the Knesset. He was elected member of the Likud's party central committee, and was appointed as a senior adviser to Israel's Minister of Justice.

Ben-Abraham served as commissioner, Commission on Judicial Nominees Evaluation of the State Bar of California. In that capacity he interviewed and evaluated hundreds of judges and several justices of the California Supreme Court.

Appointed by the Governor and by the State Bar of California, Ben-Abraham received his security clearance from the California Department of Justice and  the FBI. He was sworn in by Chief Justice Malcolm Lucas.

AlHew

Human Cloning 

In 2001 Ben-Abraham, along with Panayiotis Zavos, a reproductive physiologist, and Severino Antinori, an infertility specialist, announced their attempt at cloning the first human in an undisclosed country by 2003. The group attempted the procedure, but stated that it was unsuccessful.

References

20th-century births
Living people
Israeli scientists
Likud politicians
Year of birth missing (living people)